YASS (Yet Another Similarity Searcher) is a free software, pairwise sequence alignment software  for nucleotide sequences, that is, it can search for similarities between DNA or RNA sequences. YASS accepts nucleotide sequences in either plain text or the FASTA format and the output format includes the BLAST tabular output. YASS uses several transition-constrained spaced seed k-mers, which allow considerably improved sensitivity. YASS can be used locally on a user's machine, or as SaaS on the YASS web server, which produces a browser based dot-plot.

See also
Sequence alignment software
PatternHunter
BLAST
FASTA
JAligner

References

External links
Official website

Free bioinformatics software
Computational biology